Auguste Alexandre Hirsch (8 July 1833 - 24 December 1912) was a French Academic painter and lithographer. He was born in Lyon and died in Paris. He painted portraits, history and genre paintings, as well works inspired by classical mythology.

Biography 
Auguste Alexandre Hirsch was born in Lyon, into a Jewish family, and was the son of Alexandre Hirsch (1801-1890), a merchant embroiderer, and Rosalie Mayer (1801-1885). His siblings were Malvina Hirsch (1826-1917), Abraham Hirsch (1828-1913), the chief architect of the City of Lyon, Julie Hirsch (born in 1831) and Joseph Hirsch (1836-1901).

He made his debut in 1857 with a drawing of Moses. He then exhibited in Paris and Lyon from 1857 to 1909. He was given an honourable mention and a bronze medal in 1889 and 1890, as well as a gold medal in 1889, at the Universal Exhibition.

In 1870 he made a trip to Morocco, which inspired a number of his paintings depicting scenes from the community of Tetouan.

In 1877 he painted the ceiling of the Célestins theater in Lyon.

He was inspector of drawing education at the Fine Arts administration in 1879 and inspector of departmental museums in 1887. He wrote the article “Practical perspective” for the Dictionary of primary education and instruction.

On 29 August 1889 he was made a Knight of the National Order of the Legion of Honour (Chevalier de la Légion d'honneur).

Notes

References

Citations

Sources 

 

19th-century French artists
Lithographers
1833 births
Academic art
1912 deaths
French male artists
French male painters
Officiers of the Ordre des Palmes Académiques
Recipients of the Legion of Honour
Artists from Lyon
Chevaliers of the Légion d'honneur
19th-century French male artists